Diaphorobacter polyhydroxybutyrativorans is a Gram-negative, facultatively aerobic and rod-shaped bacterium from the genus of Diaphorobacter which has been isolated from biofilm from a denitrifying reactor in Beijing in China. Diaphorobacter polyhydroxybutyrativorans has the ability to degrade poly(3-hydroxybutyrate-co-3-hydroxyvalerate).

References 

Comamonadaceae
Bacteria described in 2015